This is a list of Roman consuls, individuals who were either elected or nominated to the highest elected political office of the Roman Republic, or a high office of the Empire, but for whom an exact date of when they served in office is absent. Most are reckoned to be suffect consuls, but occasionally it encompasses an ordinary consul.

3rd century BC

1st century AD

2nd century

3rd century

4th century

Footnotes

References

Sources
 Alföldy, Géza Konsulat und Senatorenstand unter der Antoninen Bonn: Rudolf Habelt Verlag (1977)
 Jones, A. H. M.; Martindale, J. R.; Morris, J. The Prosopography of the later Roman Empire, Vol. I, AD 260-395 (1971)
 Leunissen, Paul M. M. Konsuln und Konsulare in der Zeit von Commodus bis Severus Alexander (1989)

Roman consuls
 
Consuls